Phosphoglycerate dehydrogenase (PHGDH) is an enzyme that catalyzes the chemical reactions

3-phospho-D-glycerate + NAD+  3-phosphonooxypyruvate + NADH + H+
2-hydroxyglutarate + NAD+  2-oxoglutarate + NADH + H+

The two substrates of this enzyme are 3-phospho-D-glycerate and NAD+, whereas its 3 products are 3-phosphohydroxypyruvate, NADH, and H+

It is also possible that two substrates of this enzyme are 2-hydroxyglutarate and NAD+, whereas its 3 products are 2-oxoglutarate, NADH, and H+.

As of 2012, the most widely studied variants of PHGDH are from the E. coli and M. tuberculosis genomes. In humans, this enzyme is encoded by the PHGDH gene.

Function 

3-Phosphoglycerate dehydrogenase catalyzes the transition of 3-phosphoglycerate into 3-phosphohydroxypyruvate, which is the committed step in the phosphorylated pathway of L-serine biosynthesis. It is also essential in cysteine and glycine synthesis, which lie further downstream. This pathway represents the only way to synthesize serine in most organisms except plants, which uniquely possess multiple synthetic pathways. Nonetheless, the phosphorylated pathway that PHGDH participates in is still suspected to have an essential role in serine synthesis used in the developmental signaling of plants.

Because of serine and glycine's role as neurotrophic factors in the developing brain, PHGDH has been shown to have high expression in glial and astrocyte cells during neural development.

Mechanism and regulation 

3-phosphoglycerate dehydrogenase works via an induced fit mechanism to catalyze the transfer of a hydride from the substrate to NAD+, a required cofactor. In its active conformation, the enzyme's active site has multiple cationic residues that likely stabilize the transition state of the reaction between the negatively charged substrate and NAD+. The positioning is such that the substrate's alpha carbon and the C4 of the nicotinamide ring are brought into a proximity that facilitates the hydride transfer producing NADH and the oxidized substrate.

PHGDH is allosterically regulated by its downstream product, L-serine. This feedback inhibition is understandable considering that 3-phosphoglycerate is an intermediate in the glycolytic pathway. Given that PHGDH represents the committed step in the production of serine in the cell, flux through the pathway must be carefully controlled.

L-serine binding has been shown to exhibit cooperative behavior. Mutants that decreased this cooperativity also increased in sensitivity to serine's allosteric inhibition, suggesting a separation of the chemical mechanisms that result in allosteric binding cooperativity and active site inhibition. The mechanism of inhibition is Vmax type, indicating that serine affects the reaction rate rather than the binding affinity of the active site.

Although L-serine's allosteric effects are usually the focus of regulatory investigation, it has been noted that in some variants of the enzyme, 3-phosphoglycerate dehydrogenase is inhibited at separate positively charged allosteric site by high concentrations of its own substrate.

Structure 

3-Phosphoglycerate dehydrogenase is a tetramer, composed of four identical, asymmetric subunits. At any time, only a maximum of two adjacent subunits present a catalytically active site; the other two are forced into an inactive conformation. This results in half-of-the-sites activity with regard to both active and allosteric sites, meaning that only the two sites of the active subunits must be bound for essentially maximal effect with regard to catalysis and inhibition respectively. There is some evidence that further inhibition occurs with the binding of the third and fourth serine molecules, but it is relatively minimal.

The subunits from the E. coli PHGDH have three distinct domains, whereas those from M. tuberculosis have four. It is noted that the human enzyme more closely resembles that of M. tuberculosis, including the site for allosteric substrate inhibition. Concretely, three general types of PHGDH have been proposed: Type I, II, and III. Type III has two distinct domains, lacks both allosteric sites, and is found in various unicellular organisms. Type II has serine binding sites and encompasses the well-studied E. coli PHGDH. Type I possesses both the serine and substrate allosteric binding sites and encompasses M. tuberculosis and mammalian PHGDHs.

The regulation of catalytic activity is thought to be a result of the movement of rigid domains about flexible “hinges.” When the substrate binds to the open active site, the hinge rotates and closes the cleft. Allosteric inhibition thus likely works by locking the hinge in a state that produces the open active site cleft.

The variant from M. tuberculosis also exhibits an uncommon dual pH optimum for catalytic activity.

Evolution 
3-Phosphoglycerate dehydrogenase possesses less than 20% homology to other NAD-dependent oxidoreductases and exhibits significant variance between species. There does appear to be conservation in specific binding domain residues, but there is still some variation in the positively charged active site residues between variants. For example, Type III PHGDH enzymes can be broken down into two subclasses where the key histidine residue is replaced with a lysine residue.

Disease relevance 

Homozygous or compound heterozygous mutations in 3-phosphoglycerate dehydrogenase cause Neu–Laxova syndrome and phosphoglycerate dehydrogenase deficiency. In addition significantly shortening lifespan, PHGDH deficiencies are known to cause congenital microcephaly, psychomotor retardation, and intractable seizures in both humans and rats, presumably due to the essential signaling within the nervous system that serine, glycine, and other downstream molecules are intimately involved with. Treatment typically involves oral supplementation of serine and glycine and has been shown most effective when started in utero via oral ingestion by the mother.

Mutations that result in increased PHGDH activity are also associated with increased risk of oncogenesis, including certain breast cancers. This finding suggests that pathways providing an outlet for diverting carbon out of glycolysis may be beneficial for rapid cell growth.

It has been reported that PHGDH can also catalyze the conversion of alpha-ketoglutarate to 2-Hydroxyglutaric acid in certain variants. Thus, a mutation in the enzyme is hypothesized to contribute to 2-Hydroxyglutaric aciduria in humans, although there is debate as to whether or not this catalysis is shared by human PHGDH.

Research results suggest that PHGDH could serve as a blood biomarker of Alzheimer's disease.

References